Allen Lorenz "A. J." Pollock (born December 5, 1987) is an American professional baseball outfielder for the Seattle Mariners of Major League Baseball (MLB). He has previously played in MLB for the Arizona Diamondbacks, Los Angeles Dodgers, and Chicago White Sox.

Pollock played college baseball for the Notre Dame Fighting Irish. The Diamondbacks selected Pollock in the first round of the 2009 Major League Baseball draft. He made his MLB debut with the Diamondbacks in 2012. Pollock was an MLB All-Star and won a Gold Glove Award in 2015.

Early life
A. J. Pollock was born in Hebron, Connecticut, to parents Al and Karen Pollock. His family lived an hour and forty minutes away from Foxboro, Massachusetts, and Pollock and his father would routinely make the trip to watch New England Patriots' home games.

Pollock attended RHAM High School in his hometown of Hebron, where he played basketball, soccer, and baseball. In his senior year, Pollock  was a member of the National Honor Society. That year, he was named Gatorade Player of the Year in Connecticut, receiving the most votes for a Connecticut player since 1974, and was also named the state's Player of the Year by the coaches' association. Pollock finished his high school baseball career with a .411 batting average, 55 runs batted in (RBIs), 26 walks, 27 stolen bases, and eight strikeouts over 248 at bats.

College career
Pollock attended the University of Notre Dame, where he played college baseball for the Notre Dame Fighting Irish as an outfielder and third baseman. Pollock was named a Freshman All-American, leading the team with a .372 batting average. In 2007 playing for the NECBL Vermont Mountaineers, he won the 10th Player Award. Pollock was rated by Baseball America before his sophomore season as the league's second-best 2009 MLB prospect and best pure hitter. During his sophomore season, Pollock hit .352 and led the team in hitting and stolen bases and was a First-Team All-Big East Conference as a center fielder. After the 2008 season, he played collegiate summer baseball for the Falmouth Commodores of the Cape Cod Baseball League, where he hit .377 and was named MVP of the league. In his junior season at Notre Dame, Pollock hit .365, had an on-base percentage of .443, and a slugging percentage of .610. Pollock also made no errors in 159 chances and stole 21 bases in 25 tries. Pollock became second player ever to lead the team in batting average for three consecutive years.

Professional career

Arizona Diamondbacks

The Arizona Diamondbacks selected Pollock in the first round of the 2009 MLB draft. He was chosen as a compensation pick from the Los Angeles Dodgers for the signing of Orlando Hudson.

The Diamondbacks invited Pollock to spring training in 2010. He broke his right elbow while attempting to make a diving catch. Pollock missed the entire season due to the injury.

Pollock was called up to the majors for the first time on April 18, 2012, and made his debut that day. Batting as a pinch hitter for Justin Upton, Pollock collected his first career MLB hit, a single, on April 23 against the Phillies. He played in 31 games that season for the Diamondbacks, batting .247 with two home runs and eight RBIs.

In 2013, Pollock batted .269 with eight home runs and 38 RBIs the course of 137 games.

Pollock missed the second half of the 2014 season with an injury. Up to that point in the season, he was batting .302.

In 2015, he was named a National League All-Star. He ended the season batting .315 with 20 home runs and 76 RBIs. He led the National League in power-speed number (26.4). Pollock signed to a two-year contract extension worth $10.25 million on February 8, 2016. Pollock broke his right elbow again at the end of spring training, this time on a slide at home plate, and missed most of the 2016 season. In the 12 games he would appear in during the 2016 season, Pollock would record 10 hits on 41 at bats, a .244 batting average.

On May 15, 2017, Pollock was placed on the 10-day disabled list due to a right groin strain. Over the course of 112 games in 2017, Pollock would record a batting average of .266, 14 home runs, and 49 RBI.
 
In 2018, Pollock hit .257 with 21 home runs and 65 RBIs over 113 games. He was also 13 for 15 in stolen base opportunities.

Los Angeles Dodgers
On January 26, 2019, the Los Angeles Dodgers announced that they had signed Pollock to a four-year contract, with a player option for another year.

On April 30, 2019, the Dodgers placed Pollock on the injured list with a right elbow inflammation. He did not rejoin the team until July 12. In September, the Dodgers moved Pollock to left field for the rest of the season. For the season he appeared in 86 games, batting .266/.327/.468, with 15 homers and 47 RBIs.

The 2020 season was shortened because of the COVID-19 pandemic, but Pollock played in 55 of the Dodgers' 60 games. On September 16, Pollock hit his 100th career home run, off of Adrián Morejón of the San Diego Padres. He batted .276/.314 (a career low)/.566 (a career high) with 16 home runs and 34 RBIs. In the postseason, Pollock had one hit (a double) in five at-bats in the Wild Card Series, three hits in 10 at-bats in the 2020 NLDS, four hits in 20 at-bats in the 2020 NLCS and one hit (a double) in six at-bats in the 2020 World Series, which the Dodgers won in six games.

On May 2, 2021, against the Milwaukee Brewers, Pollock hit two home runs (including a grand slam) and drove in a career high eight RBI. Pollock received player of the week for July 5–11, 2021, during the week he had a four-game hitting streak while  batting .391/.462/1.043 with three doubles, four home runs and four RBI. For the 2021 season Pollock had a .297 batting average with 21 home runs and 69 RBI. In the post-season, he was hitless in three at-bats in the Wild Card Game, had three hits in 11 at-bats (.273) over four games in the 2021 NLDS and eight hits in 21 at-bats (.381) with two home runs in the 2021 NLCS.

Chicago White Sox
On April 1, 2022, Pollock was traded to the Chicago White Sox in exchange for Craig Kimbrel. Overall in 2022, Pollock appeared in 138 games hitting to a .245 average with 14 home runs and 56 RBIs. Pollock declined his option for 2023 making him a free agent.

Seattle Mariners
On January 12, 2023, Pollock signed a one-year, $7 million contract with the Seattle Mariners.

International career
Pollock played for the United States national baseball team at the 2011 Pan American Games.

Personal life
Pollock became engaged to his girlfriend, Kate, in March 2014. They met at Notre Dame, where Kate played for the lacrosse team. They were married after the 2014 season. In May 2020, Pollock and his wife welcomed a daughter at only 24 weeks old, and she spent 128 days in the hospital after her birth. The family resides in Phoenix, Arizona.

References

External links

1987 births
Living people
Arizona Diamondbacks players
Arizona League Diamondbacks players
Baseball players at the 2011 Pan American Games
Baseball players from Connecticut
Chicago White Sox players
Falmouth Commodores players
Gold Glove Award winners
Los Angeles Dodgers players
Major League Baseball center fielders
Major League Baseball left fielders
Medalists at the 2011 Pan American Games
Mobile BayBears players
National League All-Stars
Notre Dame Fighting Irish baseball players
Pan American Games medalists in baseball
Pan American Games silver medalists for the United States
People from Hebron, Connecticut
Rancho Cucamonga Quakes players
Reno Aces players
Scottsdale Scorpions players
South Bend Silver Hawks players
United States national baseball team players